Anders Järryd and Hans Simonsson were the defending champions, but did not partner together this year.  Järryd partnered Stefan Edberg, losing in the quarterfinals.  Simsonsson partnered Cássio Motta, losing in the quarterfinals.

Henri Leconte and Tomáš Šmíd won the title, defeating Vijay Amritraj and Ilie Năstase 3–6, 7–6, 6–4 in the final.

Seeds
All seeds receive a bye into the second round.

Draw

Finals

Top half

Bottom half

References
Draw

Stockholm Open
1984 Grand Prix (tennis)